This is a list of operational and former Australian psychiatric hospitals'''.

Australian Capital Territory
There are no institutions known to have existed.

New South Wales

Northern Territory
There are no asylums known to have existed.

Queensland

South Australia
Glenside Hospital
James Nash House

Tasmania
 Cascades Female Factory
Royal Derwent Hospital (Willow Court) - This hospital was the oldest operating hospital for the mentally ill in Australia, operating from 1830–2000
Royal Hobart Hospital Unit K
Northside Clinic
Millbrook Rise
Spencer Clinic

Victoria

Pleasant View Receiving House in Preston (short lived).  Heatherton Hospital in south east Melbourne.

Western Australia

See also
 List of Australian prisons
 List of hospitals in Australia

References

Psychiatric